Aleš Čeh (born 22 July 1980) is a retired Slovenian footballer who played as a midfielder.

References

External links
NZS profile 

1980 births
Living people
People from Ptuj
Slovenian footballers
Slovenia youth international footballers
Association football midfielders
Slovenian Second League players
Slovenian PrvaLiga players
NK Aluminij players
NK Maribor players
NK Drava Ptuj players
NK Nafta Lendava players
NK Zavrč players
NK Drava Ptuj (2004) players
Slovenian expatriate footballers
Slovenian expatriate sportspeople in Austria
Expatriate footballers in Austria
Slovenian football managers